Occitan may refer to:

 Something of, from, or related to the Occitania territory in parts of France, Italy, Monaco and Spain.
 Something of, from, or related to the Occitania administrative region of France.
 Occitan language, spoken in parts of France, Italy, Monaco and Spain.
 Occitans, people of France, Italy, Monaco and Spain.

Language and nationality disambiguation pages